Tetraphenyllead is an organolead compound with the chemical formula  or PbPh4. It is a white solid.

Preparation 
Tetraphenyllead can be produced by the reaction of phenylmagnesium bromide and lead chloride at diethyl ether. This is the method used by P. Pfeiffer and P. Truskier to produce tetraphenyllead first at 1904.

Reactions 
Hydrogen chloride's ethanol solution can reacts with tetraphenyllead and substitute some of the phenyl groups to chlorine atoms:

Just like tetrabutyllead, tetraphenyllead and sulfur reacts explosively at 150 °C and produce diphenyl sulfide and lead sulfide:

Tetraphenyllead reacts with iodine in chloroform to produce triphenyllead iodide.

References

Phenyl compounds
Organolead compounds
Substances discovered in the 1900s